Haynes Motor Museum at Sparkford near Yeovil in Somerset, England, contains over 400 cars and motorcycles and a collection of other automobilia.

The museum was established in 1985 by John Harold Haynes OBE (1938–2019). It is a registered charity under English law.

The exhibitions
The museum is divided into fifteen exhibitions:
The Dawn of Motoring includes exhibits dating from 1886 including a replica 1886 Benz Patent Motorwagen.
Veteran and Vintage includes 1903 Darracq Type L and a 1922 Rover 8 hp.
Wheels around the World includes a 1975 Bricklin SVI and a 1967 Citroen DS.
Minis and Micros includes a 1964 Trojan 200 and a 1965 Morris Mini MK2.
Great British Marques contains a 1965 Jaguar E Type and a 1977 Lotus Elite Type 75.
Custom and Bespoke includes a 1941 Chevrolet 1/2 ton Custom Pick Up and a 1958 split screen Morris Minor van (ex-Post Office)
The American Dream includes in pride of place a 1931 Duesenberg J Derham bodied Tourster, one of only eight built.
Motorcycle Mezzanine is in two parts: Part 1 - British and World Motorcycles, containing a 1914 BSA Flat Tank and a 1965 Honda CB72 and Part 2 - The Forshaw Speedway Collection.
Williams F1: The Drivers and The Driven includes an FW14.
Hall of Motorsport depicts varied disciplines of motorsport including a 1996 Ferrari Formula 1 Type F310 (DC) and 1950 Healey Silverstone.
The Morris Story includes 1917 Morris Cowley and a 1955 Morris Minor Convertible.
Memory Lane contains a 1965 Ford Cortina Mk1 and a 1950 Rover 75.
 Travelling in Style: Luxury Cars includes a 2007 Bentley Continental GT and a 1957 Bentley Series 1.
Ferrari: The Man, The Machine, The Myth contains a 2000 Ferrari 360 F1 and a 1980 Ferrari 512 Berlinetta Boxer.
The Red Room, contains red sports cars from around the world including a 1966 Ford Mustang Convertible and a 1959 Austin-Healey Sprite.

The museum also has an outdoor children's play area, Autogame Experience including penny arcade games of the 1950s and 1960s, retro 1980s classics and 1990s favourites such as "Sega Rally".

In April 2014 the Museum completed an extensive £6M redevelopment and now has an entrance foyer and reception area; a large museum shop, a café, conference and hospitality facilities and Haynes Workshop Services. The Museum regularly hosts conferences for organisations outside the motor industry.

In popular culture
The museum featured in an episode of the police drama Macdonald and Dodds titled A Billion Beats as the headquarters of fictitious Formula 1 team Addingtons which included scenes shot in The Red Room.

References

External links 
 
 Classic Car Collection Haynes Series of photos of the classic cars at Haynes International Motor Museum

Museums established in 1985
Automobile museums in England
Museums in Somerset
Motorcycle museums in the United Kingdom
Charities based in Somerset
Science and technology in Somerset
1985 establishments in England